Raymond D. Tarbuck (4 May 1897 – 15 November 1986) was a rear admiral in the United States Navy who is best known as a planner with General Douglas MacArthur's General Headquarters (GHQ) Southwest Pacific Area during World War II.

A 1920 graduate of the United States Naval Academy in Annapolis, Maryland, Tarbuck spent most of his early career on destroyers. During a tour of duty in the Caribbean, he served ashore with the United States occupation of Nicaragua. Later, while at the Naval War College at Newport, Rhode Island, he wrote a thesis entitled "The Nicaraguan Policy of the United States", which was subsequently published by the United States Naval Institute.

Tarbuck received his first command, the destroyer  in May 1939, and in March 1941, he assumed command of Destroyer Division 70. Then, in October 1941, he became an instructor in air observer and navigator training with the United States Army Air Corps at Maxwell Field, Alabama. In 1943 he was assigned to General MacArthur's GHQ, where he planned a series of combined operations, and accurately predicted the course of the Battle of Leyte Gulf. He served with GHQ until December 1944, when he became chief of staff of the VII Amphibious Force.

After the war he became the chief of staff of Amphibious Forces, Atlantic Fleet. His last command was of the battleship . He retired from active service on 1 July 1950, and received a tombstone promotion to the rank of rear admiral.

Early life
Raymond  (Ray) Tarbuck was born in Philadelphia on 4 May 1897. His middle name caused him embarrassment and was seldom used, and he preferred the shortened form of his first name. He was educated at Philadelphia Central High School and the Philadelphia College of Pedagogy, where he studied to be a teacher, graduating with a Bachelor of Arts degree. He also attended the Naval Academy Preparatory School.

Tarbuck was appointed to the United States Naval Academy in Annapolis, Maryland in June 1917 by Congressman George W. Edmonds of Pennsylvania's 4th congressional district. At the Academy he was on the shooting team, and was assistant art editor of the Lucky Bag, and the editor of The Log magazine. While there he took his summer cruises on the battleships  and  during World War I. He was commissioned as an ensign on graduation on 5 June 1920. His class was graduated in two groups due to the disruption caused by World War I. For his first assignment, he chose the destroyer tender , because it was based at the League Island Navy Yard in Philadelphia, and he was in love with Marion Orf, a woman who lived in Philadelphia's Germantown section. The two were married in 1921. They had a son, Richard Ray Tarbuck, and a daughter, Joan.

He served in succession as torpedo officer on the destroyer , as a communications officer on the cruiser  and as gunnery officer on the destroyer . During this cruise in the Caribbean, he served ashore with the United States occupation of Nicaragua.

Tarbuck attended the Naval Postgraduate School at Annapolis from 1927 to 1928, and then the Naval War College at Newport, Rhode Island. While there he wrote a thesis entitled "The Nicaraguan Policy of the United States", which was subsequently published by the United States Naval Institute. He returned to sea in 1929 as executive officer of the destroyer , which sailed to China, Japan and the Philippines as part of the Asiatic Fleet. His daughter Joan died in Shanghai. On returning to the United States in 1932, he was assigned to the University of California as a Naval Reserve Officers Training Corps instructor. He taught astronomy there as an assistant professor. Robert Gordon Sproul requested that Tarbuck be permanently assigned to the university, but the Navy turned him down on the grounds that Tarbuck's career would suffer without sea duty. Following the pattern of alternating duty at sea with duty ashore, he was assigned to the Fleet Training Division of the Bureau of Navigation from June 1937 to May 1939.

World War II
In May 1939, Tarbuck received his first command, of the destroyer , which was part of the U.S. Pacific Fleet. While he was its captain, he was promoted to the rank of commander. In March 1941, he assumed command of Destroyer Division 70, which consisted of five destroyers based on the West Coast. In October 1941, he was ordered to report to the Naval Air Station Pensacola, an unusual destination for a non-aviator. The United States Army Air Corps had requested that some Naval officers be sent to Maxwell Field, Alabama, as instructors in air observer and navigator training, and Tarbuck was one of the three officers selected. At Maxwell, he wrote three manuals on ship and aircraft recognition, which became course materials. The ability to speak "Army", and knowledge of the conduct of land, sea and air operations, would prove important in his selection for his next post. He was promoted to captain on 20 June 1942.

In 1943, the Supreme Commander in the Southwest Pacific Area, General Douglas MacArthur, requested a Naval officer for his General Headquarters (GHQ) to replace Captain Herbert J. Ray, an officer who had escaped from the Philippines with him in 1942. Ray had been appointed to command the battleship , and Tarbuck was chosen to replace him. En route to Australia, Tarbuck met with Admiral Chester Nimitz, who told him in no uncertain terms that anti-Army and anti-MacArthur sentiments had no place in his command. As it was, Tarbuck became a loyal supporter of MacArthur.

Tarbuck expected to become the head of a naval section within GHQ, but instead found himself part of Brigadier General Stephen J. Chamberlin G-3 Section, the staff section responsible for planning and operations. He found that more than forty naval officers were working at GHQ, but they were dispersed, working in nearly every corner of the staff. Tarbuck became head of a planning group known as the Red Team. This was one of three teams; there was also a White Team under a US army officer, Colonel Peyton, and a Blue Team under an Australian Army officer, Brigadier Tom White.

His job was to prepare staff studies on upcoming potential operations. While he did do naval planning, his team prepared plans that coordinated land, air and sea operations. A staff study might be put into effect and become an operation, or MacArthur might shelve it in favor of an alternative operation, especially if the staff study revealed that it would be too time-consuming, difficult or costly. The three teams would work simultaneously on three different objectives in leapfrog fashion. Tarbuck routinely attended staff conferences that involved naval matters.

He led the planning for the Battle of Leyte, known as Operation King II, and predicted that the Japanese fleet would attempt to intervene, striking at the invasion force through the Surigao Strait. His warning that the Japanese fleet would sortie was discounted by MacArthur's chief intelligence officer, Brigadier General Charles A. Willoughby, but Tarbuck put his objection in writing. MacArthur would later commend him for an accurate prediction of the course of the Battle of Leyte Gulf.

Tarbuck was on hand to see the battle as an observer on the command ship . He watched as his predictions on the courses of the Battle of Surigao Strait and Battle off Samar unfolded. On the morning of 25 October he wrote:

A while later he wrote:

In his report on the battle, Vice Admiral Randall Jacobs called Tarbuck's predictions as "almost uncanny". For his service with GHQ, Tarbuck was awarded the Legion of Merit.

In December 1944, Tarbuck became chief of staff of the VII Amphibious Force, which was under the command of Rear Admiral Daniel E. Barbey. He was promoted to the wartime rank of commodore on 3 April 1945. When Barbey went on leave, he left Tarbuck in command of VII Amphibious Force, despite the fact that his three amphibious group commanders, William Fechteler, Albert G. Noble and Arthur D. Struble were all rear admirals. They were in overall command of the operations for which they were responsible however. For his service as chief of staff of the VII Amphibious Force, Tarbuck was awarded a second Legion of Merit. His citation read:

Later life
Tarbuck became the chief of staff of Amphibious Forces, Atlantic Fleet in December 1945. He reverted to the rank of captain on 20 June 1946. On 30 June he assumed command of the battleship . After a year in this command, he became Inspector General of the Eleventh Naval District at San Diego, California. At the conclusion of this posting, he retired from active service on 1 July 1950. On retirement, he received a tombstone promotion to the rank of rear admiral.

He became program administrator for the San Diego Fine Arts Gallery, and served with the San Diego Board of Health and other community projects. He also served on the South Bay Committee for San Diego. He died in Coronado, California on 15 November 1986, and was interred in the Fort Rosecrans National Cemetery, San Diego, California. His papers are in the Douglas MacArthur Memorial in Norfolk, Virginia.

Footnotes

Notes

References
 
 
 
 

1897 births
1986 deaths
Military personnel from Philadelphia
United States Naval Academy alumni
Recipients of the Legion of Merit
United States Navy World War II admirals
United States Navy admirals
Burials in California